Pollyanna is a best-selling 1913 novel by Eleanor H. Porter. As a feminine given name, Pollyanna is derived from the name Polly, which is also derived from the name Mary which could mean "sea", and combined with the name Anna which means "grace" in Hebrew. The variants of this name includes Anna Maria, Anne-Marie, Mariana, and Marianne.

Pollyanna may also refer to:

People
 Pollyana Papel (born 1987), a Brazilian singer, songwriter and actress
 Pollyanna Pickering (1942-2018), British wildlife artist and environmentalist
 Pollyanna Woodward (born 1982), English TV presenter

Fictional characters
 Pollyanna Whittier, the titular character from the 1913 Eleanor Porter novel Pollyanna

Entertainment

Film
 Pollyanna (1920 film), an adaptation of the novel, starring Mary Pickford
 Pollyanna (1960 film), an adaptation of the novel, starring Hayley Mills

Music
 Pollyanna (album), the second studio album by Emo band Northstar
 Pollyanna (band), an Australian band

Songs
 "Pollyanna", a recurring song in Mother, a Nintendo role-playing video game series
 "Pollyanna", a song by Billy Joe Royal off his 1965 album, Down in the Boondocks
 "Pollyanna", a 2021 single by American punk rock band Green Day

Other uses
 Pollyanna Creep, a term implying overly optimistic presentation of economic measurements by government
 Pollyanna principle, the tendency to remember pleasant events and forget unpleasant ones
 , a U.S. Navy ship name
 , a United States Navy patrol boat in commission from 1917 to 1919
 Secret Santa, a Western holiday tradition referred to in Pennsylvania as Pollyanna

See also

Anna (disambiguation)
Polly (disambiguation)